German submarine U-998 was a Type VIIC/41 U-boat of Nazi Germany's Kriegsmarine during World War II.

She was ordered on 14 October 1941, and was laid down on 5 December 1942, at Blohm & Voss, Hamburg, as yard number 198. She was launched on 18 August 1943, and commissioned under the command of Kapitänleutnant Hans Fiedler on 7 October 1943.

Design
German Type VIIC/41 submarines were preceded by the heavier Type VIIC submarines. U-998 had a displacement of  when at the surface and  while submerged. She had two shafts and two  propellers.

U-998 was fitted with five  torpedo tubes (four fitted at the bow and one at the stern), fourteen torpedoes, one  SK C/35 naval gun, (220 rounds), one  Flak M42 and two  C/30 anti-aircraft guns. The boat had a complement of between forty-four and fifty-two.

Service history
U-998 had been fitted out in May 1944, with a Schnorchel underwater-breathing apparatus.

Departing Kiel on 12 June 1944, U-998 left on her first, and only, war patrol. Five days into her patrol U-998 was located on 16 June 1944, west of Bergen, by two Norwegian Mosquito FB Mk XVIII aircraft from 333 Sqdn RAF, piloted by Erling U. Johansen and Lauritz Humlen. They were able to hit the boat with 57mm cannon fire and depth charges which caused severe damage to U-998. She was forced to return to Bergen, Norway, where she was removed from active service due to the damage from the attack. U-998 would be cannibalized for spare parts until being broken up later in 1944.

See also
 Battle of the Atlantic

References

Bibliography

German Type VIIC/41 submarines
U-boats commissioned in 1943
World War II submarines of Germany
1943 ships
Ships built in Hamburg
Maritime incidents in June 1944